Hitler's Bodyguard (2008–09) is a 13-episode British television documentary series chronicling Adolf Hitler's loyal bodyguard personnel who guarded him throughout his career. The series contains reenactments and first-person accounts of the multiple assassination attempts Hitler faced. The series was created by the producers of Churchill's Bodyguard.

The series notes that Hitler required a large number of bodyguards compared to Winston Churchill who only had few. The show was added to Netflix in Australia and New Zealand on 28 February 2017. It is also on Amazon Prime Video.

See also 
 Apocalypse: The Second World War (2009) – an RTBF documentary on the Second World War
 All Our Yesterdays – a Granada TV series that may be considered a precursor to "The World at War".
 The Great War (1964) – BBC TV production
 The Secret War (1977) – a BBC TV series on the technological advances of the Second World War
 The Unknown War (1978) – an American documentary television series, produced with Soviet cooperation after the release of The World at War.
 Churchill's Bodyguard (2005) – a 13-part documentary with the same directors and narrator

References

External links 

2008 British television series debuts
2009 British television series endings
2000s British documentary television series
British military television series
Documentary television series about World War II
English-language television shows